Sara Magnaghi (born 30 October 1993) is an Italian female rower, medal winner at senior level at the European Rowing Championships.

References

External links
 

1993 births
Living people
Italian female rowers
Sportspeople from Como